Tsvetnoye is a rural locality (a selo) and the administrative center of Tsvetnovsky Selsoviet of Volodarsky District, Astrakhan Oblast, Russia. The population was 1,121 as of 2010. There are 20 streets.

Geography 
Tsvetnoye is located 32 km south of Volodarsky (the district's administrative centre) by road. Zelyony Ostrov is the nearest rural locality.

References 

Rural localities in Volodarsky District, Astrakhan Oblast